The Raanes Peninsula is located on the southwestern coast of Ellesmere Island, a part of the Qikiqtaaluk Region of the Canadian territory of Nunavut.

References

External links
 Raanes Peninsula at the Glacier Atlas of Canada

Ellesmere Island
Peninsulas of Qikiqtaaluk Region